Still Alive: The Remixes is a remix album comprising different versions of the song "Still Alive" by Swedish pop rock singer Lisa Miskovsky. It was released by Artwerk on 11 November 2008 to coincide with the North American release date of Mirror's Edge, an action-adventure video game developed by EA Digital Illusions CE (DICE) for which "Still Alive" had been chosen as the main theme.

The instrumental version of the track was used in the mobile game "Mirror's Edge (iOS)". The Teddybears and Paul Van Dyk remixes were used in the flash game "Mirror's Edge 2D".

Background and writing 
The song "Still Alive" was recorded exclusively for the video game Mirror's Edge. The music was written and produced by Arnthor Birgisson and Rami Yacoub, who have also written material for artists such as Britney Spears, Shayne Ward and Westlife; Miskovsky wrote the lyrics.  The song and several of its remixes have been featured in several previews, first appearing in a teaser trailer released on 6 May 2008. , a music video directed by Matthew Stawski and featuring Miskovsky has been produced for the song in Los Angeles, California.

Critical reception 
Still Alive: The Remixes has received some favourable reviews. While reviewing the album for IGN, Spence D. praises several of the remixes, saying that each remixer "has left their own unique stamp on the material, improving it by tweaking it as they saw fit". However, he also points out that "it's the remixes that really score here, taking an otherwise mundane generi-pop track and turning it upside down".

Chart performance 
A week after Still Alive: The Remixes was released, the lead track entered the Swedish Singles Chart. It peaked at number 29, and remained in the chart for a total of three weeks.

Track listings 
Three versions of Still Alive: The Remixes have been released, including a promotional release and a North American release containing four additional versions of the lead track. The promotional release is available for critical review via download and is packaged as a bonus disc for the PC version of the game, the other releases are available in various formats including 12" record and CD, and for download from various online retailers including iTunes, eMusic and Amazon. The original version of "Still Alive" was written by Arnthor Birgisson, Rami Yacoub and Lisa Miskovsky, and was produced by Birgisson and Yacoub.

Standard release

North American release

Promotional release

Personnel 
The following people contributed to Still Alive: The Remixes.

Lisa Miskovsky – vocals
Arnthor Birgisson – writer, producer
Rami Yacoub – writer, producer
Benny Benassi – remix
Paul van Dyk – remix
Armand Van Helden – remix
Junkie XL – remix
Teddybears – remix

References 

Lisa Miskovsky albums
2008 remix albums
Songs written by Arnthor Birgisson